RML 12-inch 35-ton guns were large rifled muzzle-loading guns used as primary armament on British battleships of the 1870s. They were the longer and more powerful of the two 12-inch British RML guns, the other being the 25-ton gun.

Design 

This gun design originated in 1871 as an  gun firing a  projectile.

Naval service 
Guns were mounted on:
 s of 1873

Note: The two 12-inch guns installed in 's forward turret were 12.5-inch 38-ton guns bored instead to 12 inches, and designated "12-inch 38-ton", as the necessary 12-inch 35-ton guns were not available. These 2 guns used the same charges and projectiles as the standard 12-inch 35-ton guns installed in Thunderers aft turret which simplified the supply of ammunition. It was one of these "12-inch 38-ton" guns that was accidentally double-loaded and exploded on 2 January 1879.

Ammunition 

When the gun was first introduced projectiles had several rows of "studs" which engaged with the gun's rifling to impart spin. Sometime after 1878, "attached gas-checks" were fitted to the bases of the studded shells, reducing wear on the guns and improving their range and accuracy. Subsequently, "automatic gas-checks" were developed which could rotate shells, allowing the deployment of a new range of studless ammunition. Thus, any particular gun potentially operated with a mix of studded and studless ammunition.

The gun's primary projectile was 706-pound "Palliser" armour-piercing shot, which were fired with a "battering charge" of 110 pounds of "P" (gunpowder) for maximum velocity and hence penetrating power. Shrapnel and common (exploding) shells weighed 613 pounds and were fired with a "full charge" of 85 pounds "P" or 67 pounds "R.L.G.".

See also 
 List of naval guns

References

Bibliography 
 Treatise on the Construction and Manufacture of Ordnance in the British service. War Office, UK, 1877
 Treatise on the Construction and Manufacture of Ordnance in the British Service. War Office, UK, 1879
 Text Book of Gunnery, 1887. LONDON : PRINTED FOR HIS MAJESTY'S STATIONERY OFFICE, BY HARRISON AND SONS, ST. MARTIN'S LANE 
 Sir Thomas Brassey, The British Navy, Volume II. London: Longmans, Green and Co. 1882
 "Handbook for the 12-in. R.M.L. Gun of 35-tons (Mark I.) Land Service", 1884, London. Published by Her Majesty's Stationery Office

External links 

 Handbook for the 12 in. R.M.L. gun of 35-tons (mark I) mounted on sliding carriage and platform. Land service. 1884 at State Library of Victoria

 

Naval guns of the United Kingdom
305 mm artillery
Victorian-era weapons of the United Kingdom